Love Before Sunrise is an upcoming Philippine television drama romance series to be broadcast by GMA Network. Directed by Mark Sicat dela Cruz, it stars Dennis Trillo and Bea Alonzo. It is set to premiere in 2023, on the network's Telebabad lineup.

Cast and characters
Lead cast
 Dennis Trillo
 Bea Alonzo

Supporting cast
 Andrea Torres
 Sid Lucero
 Tetchie Agbayani
 Ricky Davao
 Vaness del Moral
 Matet de Leon
 Isay Alvarez-Seña
 Vince Maristela
Cheska Fausto
 Nadia Montengero

References

External links
 

Filipino-language television shows
GMA Network drama series
Philippine romance television series
Television shows set in the Philippines
Upcoming drama television series